A Coruña Airport , formerly known as Alvedro Airport, is the airport serving the Galician city of A Coruña in northwestern Spain. It is a part of the network of airports managed by Aena, a Spanish state-owned company responsible for airport management. Air traffic control is provided by Ferronats. In 2021, 595,286 passengers used the airport.

History

Early years
On 11 September 1953, the Council of Ministers of Spain ordered the urgent construction of an airport to serve the city of A Coruña. This was the first airport to serve the area, as the hilly topography and meteorological conditions in the region made construction difficult. At the time, the only air service to the province of Galicia was through the Lavacolla Airport in Santiago de Compostela, which opened in 1935.

The first airport was built on the Alvedro meseta in the municipality of Culleredo. The original air field was very sparse; subsequent projects included the construction of parking facilities and a terminal.

In 1961, radio, and electric monitoring facilities were constructed. In 1962, a terminal building was constructed, and landing lights and other signals were installed on the runway. At the same time, the legislature of A Coruña ordered the construction of a road to connect the airport with the cities of A Coruña and Santiago de Compostela. In 1963, a services building was added to the airport.

The construction was completed in May 1963, when the airport was opened to national commercial traffic. The inauguration of the airport took place on 25 May 1963, when the first commercial airliner arrived from Madrid. This first flight was operated by the Spanish Aviaco airline.

During 1964, Aviaco operated a Vigo-A Coruña-Santander-San Sebastián-Barcelona line served by Convair 440s. The routing proved to be spectacularly unpopular and unprofitable, and was discontinued after a year of service. A brief attempt in 1971 to run an identical routing was equally unsuccessful. By the end of the 1960s, the airport had begun receiving charter flights from Switzerland and London, England.

A customs office was opened in 1979, and an air traffic control room was added in 1990. A number of improvements were made during the 1980s, including an increase of runway gradation of 1 degree 12 minutes and the installation of an Instrument Landing System (ILS).

Development since the 1990s

By 1994, yearly passenger numbers had surpassed 259,000. Further expansion of the airport and its facilities, including a new terminal building, as well as the urbanization of the surrounding area has prompted continuous growth and the increasing popularity of the airport. In 2001, the airport installed jet bridges and a cargo terminal.

Current and future projects include the expansion of parking facilities, an upgrade of the ILS system from Category II to Category III, a short runway expansion, and expanded aircraft parking facilities.

Airlines and destinations 
The following airlines operate regular scheduled and charter flights at A Coruña Airport:

Statistics

Accidents and incidents
On 16 August 1973, Aviaco Flight 118 crashed while trying to land at Alvedro Airport. All 85 people on board the aircraft plus one person on the ground were killed.

References

External links 
 

Coruna
Airports established in 1963
Buildings and structures in A Coruña
Transport in A Coruña